Heinz Michael Pannwitz ( Heinz Paulsen; 28 July 1911, Berlin – 1975) was a German Nazi Gestapo officer and later  Schutzstaffel (SS) officer. Pannwitz was most notable for directing the investigation into the assassination of Obergruppenführer Reinhard Heydrich on 27 May 1942 in Prague. 

In the last two years of the war, Pannwitz ran the Sonderkommando Rote Kapelle, a combined Abwehr and Gestapo counterintelligence operation against the Red Orchestra espionage network, in France and the Low Countries.

Life
As a child, Pannwitz belonged to the Christliche Pfadfinderschaft Deutschlands 
scout association. As a youth Pannwitz was a member of the Evangelical Church in Germany but left due to divisions in the church over their stance towards Hitler and the Nazis. After completing his schooling, Pannwitz was employed as a fitter, but by 1931 was unemployed. Pannwitz then attended university to study theology and philosophy.

Military career
In February 1932, Pannwitz joined the Hitler Youth. After the Nazi rise to power (Machtergreifung), Pannwitz joined the Sturmabteilung (SA) in August 1933, and transferred in 1939 to the Schutzstaffel (SS). In 1935, he did one year of military service in the Wehrmacht and was discharged as Lieutenant. On 1 May 1937, he joined the Nazi Party.

In 1936, Pannwitz successfully applied to join the police service at the Berlin Police Headquarters and joined the Berlin Police. On 10 September 1938, he became a criminal police detective with the Berlin Criminal Investigation Department, where he headed the "aggravated burglary" department. In September 1938, in accordance with the Munich Agreement, Germany annexed the Sudetenland. In March 1939, after the full occupation of Czechoslovakia, Pannwitz was transferred in July 1939 to Prague to be a Gestapo officer, assigned to Amt IV, section 2a of the Reich Security Main Office. From 1940, he there led the Gestapo Unit II g, which was responsible for investigating assassinations, illegal possession of weapons and sabotage.

Heydrich assassination
Following the assassination attempt on the Deputy Reich Protector in Bohemia and Moravia, SS-Obergruppenführer Reinhard Heydrich on 27 May 1942 in Prague, Pannwitz was immediately assigned to lead the special commission investigating the Heydrich assassination. Pannwitz was the author of the official final report on the assassination.  In September 1942, Pannwitz was promoted to Kriminalrat, equivalent to SS-Hauptsturmführer or SS-Sturmbannführer. According to himself, because Pannwitz was not prepared to remove a Gestapo-critical passage from the report after submitting the official final report, he was heavily criticized by the Gestapo. In the autumn of 1942 Pannwitz was then called up by acquaintances in the Abwehr office for the Wehrmacht, and was posted for several months as a Non-commissioned officer to the Eastern Front.

Red Orchestra
In the spring of 1943, Pannwitz was assigned to the Gestapo headquarters in Berlin, working there for several months with the aim of investigating the Red Orchestra.

From August 1943 until the spring of 1945, Pannwitz directed the Sonderkommando Rote Kapelle operations in Paris and France, as a successor to Karl Giering. The Sonderkommando was a counterintelligence unit established by Gestapo to investigate and arrest the People of the Red Orchestra. After the Gestapo had managed to detect and unmask Soviet Main Intelligence Directorate (GRU) agents in France, the Netherlands, and Belgium,  the Sonderkommando successfully attempted to bring some of the GRU's agents under their control, in effect turning them. The Sonderkommando used the exposed radio transmitters for playbacks, using a German radio team to control and send back disinformation to the Moscow information centre of the GRU and to obtain information about the Resistance in return. This procedure was coordinated with the head of the Gestapo in the Reich Security Main Office (RSHA), Heinrich Müller. One of the groups that Pannwitz was trying to destroy in Belgium was the Trepper Group. Pannwitz used various captured members of the Trepper Group for the playbacks, such as Hermann Isbutzki.

Capture
On 3 May 1945, Pannwitz was captured by French forces in a mountain hut near Bludenz, Vorarlberg, Austria, along with Anatoly Gurevich, who was a double agent and had been a member of the Trepper Group. Both were taken to Paris for interrogation, and both were eventually handed over to Soviet authorities. Pannwitz believed he would face charges for war crimes if he was surrendered to the US, so instead he opted to be sent to the Soviet Union.

In Moscow, they were immediately arrested and locked up in the Lubyanka. Pannwitz tried to justify his decisions to the Soviet interrogator Viktor Abakumov, who didn't believe that Pannwitz had been running Funkspiel for almost two and a half years. Pannwitz offered his counterintelligence services to the Soviets for some time but nevertheless was eventually sentenced to 25 years in a Soviet Gulag for destroying the communist networks in Europe. Pannwitz was released early in 1954, and returned to West Germany from the Soviet Union in January 1956.

CIA and Gehlen Organization
Pannwitz returned to Germany with Friedrich Panzinger, a former SS officer who was also a Soviet agent. Panzinger's purposes in Germany were to penetrate the Gehlen organisation through his old Gestapo contacts. Panzinger's actions drew suspicion on Pannwitz from the Federal Intelligence Service (Bundesnachrichtendienst; BND) who suspected Pannwitz was also a Soviet agent.

In August 1956, the BND organisation hired Pannwitz, perhaps to keep him away from the Central Intelligence Agency (CIA) or the Federal Office for the Protection of the Constitution (BfV). Although the BND was planning to interrogate Pannwitz, who they considered a potentially important source, the BND failed to learn anything and, in turn, failed to send any reports to the CIA, as promised. Pannwitz through these proceedings seemed to be more concerned with money, insisting throughout his employment with the Gehlen Organization that his previous wartime Gestapo service as a Regierungsrat and his years in Soviet captivity should be recognised for pension purposes. By February 1958, Pannwitz had effectively achieved this.

In 1959, the BND finally handed Pannwitz over to the CIA. Again, he put money first and tried to get a long-term contract instead of monthly payments. He was not going to tell his story unless he was paid for it. By mid-1959, the CIA had completed debriefing and were satisfied that he was not a Soviet agent. The CIA noted that Pannwitz tried to portray the brutal and inhuman Gestapo in a favourable light.

Pannwitz lived until his death in 1975 with his wife in Ludwigsburg, where he worked as a sales representative.

War crimes
Pannwitz would have faced charges of war crimes at the end of the war had he stayed in Germany. The evidence for this involves the killing of Suzanne Spaak and part of her family. Spaak was a member of the French Resistance, and later the Trepper Group, who was arrested on 9 November 1943 in Brussels. After being tortured in January 1944, Spaak was sentenced to death. 

Pannwitz ordered her murder  when the liberation of Paris was only a few days away in August 1944. She was shot by Pannwitz in her cell at Fresnes Prison. To hide his crimes he had the corpse buried in a cemetery at Cimetière parisien de Bagneux with the words A Belgian. At the same time, he sent a letter to Belgian Foreign Minister-in-exile, Paul-Henri Spaak, falsely assuring him that his sister-in-law, Suzanne, had been taken to Germany and was safe.

Bibliography

References

1911 births
1975 deaths
Gestapo personnel
SS personnel
Military personnel from Berlin
Hitler Youth members
Date of death unknown
Place of death unknown